Rail Infrastructure projects in the United Kingdom include:

 21st-century modernisation of the Great Western Main Line
 Airdrie–Bathgate rail link
 Crossrail
 Northern Hub
 Thameslink Programme